The ten thousand rial banknote is a denomination of Iranian currency that was considered its largest denomination for decades. The banknote has had many different versions, featuring portraits of three Iranian rulers. Its latest version was published in 2017.

It was first printed by Bank Melli Iran during reign of Reza Shah in 1936–1938, but was not put into circulation because of its high amount. In 1992, it became the first ever banknote that a portrait of Ruhallah Khomeini appeared on.

Previous versions

References

Banknotes of Iran
Ten-thousand-base-unit banknotes